Donald Alexander Mackay (August 13, 1914 – December 17, 2005) was an American artist and illustrator. His illustrations appeared in Time, Life magazine, The New Times, Newsweek, National Geographic, and other publications.

Mackay died in Frederick, Maryland in 2005. He had lived in Ossining, New York.

References 
 New York Times Obituary - January 9, 2006
 Obituary

Artists from Nova Scotia
1914 births
2005 deaths
People from Halifax, Nova Scotia
Canadian illustrators